Jonatan Esteban Goitía (born 2 August 1994) is an Argentine professional footballer who plays as a defender for Deportivo Riestra.

Career
Goitía had youth stints with Deportivo Riestra and Banfield, he had appeared at senior level for the former in Primera D Metropolitana. In 2015, Goitía moved to Atlas, when he scored once in thirty fixtures as they finished second in Primera D Metropolitana. Atlas finished below eventual champions Sportivo Barracas, who signed Goitía ahead of the 2016 Primera C Metropolitana campaign. Twenty-eight appearances and two goals followed across two seasons. On 6 August 2017, Goitía joined San Martín of the Primera División. He subsequently made his professional debut, featuring in a home draw with Tigre on 5 February 2018.

Deportivo Riestra of Primera B Metropolitana resigned Goitía in January 2019.

Career statistics
.

Notes

References

External links

1994 births
Living people
People from Neuquén Province
Argentine footballers
Association football defenders
Primera D Metropolitana players
Primera C Metropolitana players
Argentine Primera División players
Deportivo Riestra players
Club Atlético Atlas footballers
Sportivo Barracas players
San Martín de San Juan footballers